The electoral history of each district in the Ohio House of Representatives can be traced from 1966 to the present.

Originally,

The [1851] constitution ... contained a complicated formula for apportionment, the so-called "major fraction rule." Under it, the state's population was divided by 100, with the resulting quotient being the ratio of representation in the House of Representatives. Any county with a population equal to at least half the ratio was entitled to one representative; a county with a population of less than half the ratio was grouped with an adjacent county for districting; a county containing a population of at least one and three-fourths the ratio was entitled to two representatives; a county with a population equal to three times the ratio was entitled to three representatives. To determine Senate districts, a similar procedure was followed; the starting point, however, was figured by dividing the state's population by 35. The ratios for the House and Senate and the resulting apportionment was determined by a board consisting of the governor, auditor, and secretary of state.

In 1903, at the urging of U.S. Senator Mark Hanna, who led the state's politically dominant Republican political machine, Ohio voters amended the state constitution to award each county one representative. The remaining representatives were apportioned to the counties on the basis of population. This provision later became known as the "Hanna amendment".

In June 1964, the Supreme Court of the United States ruled in Reynolds v. Sims, 377 U.S. 533 (1964) that state legislature districts had to be roughly equal in population. A case challenging the "Hanna amendment" reached the Supreme Court at about the same time as Reynolds v. Sims. On June 22, 1964, the Supreme Court held Ohio's method for apportioning representatives (but not state senators) to be in violation of the Constitution per the decision in Reynolds v. Sims. On remand, the United States District Court for the Northern District of Ohio ordered the state legislature to adopt a new apportionment scheme to comply with the holding in Nolan v. Rhodes.

Elections under the new apportionment scheme were first held in November 1966, for terms to begin per the Ohio Constitution on the first day in January 1967.

1st district
The 1st district has always been based in Wayne County and now consists of the entire county. It is one-third of the 27th Senate district. It has a Cook PVI of R+9.

2nd district
The 2nd district has always been based in Mansfield and now consists of all of Richland County. It is one-third of the 22nd Senate district. It has a Cook PVI of R+5.

Current U.S. Senator Sherrod Brown represented the district from 1975 to 1982.

3rd district
The 3rd district has always been based in Wood County and now consists of the entire county. It is one-third of the 2nd Senate district.  It has a Cook PVI of R+1.

The district was represented by the Ohio Speaker of the House with Charles Kurfess from 1967 to 1972.

4th district
The 4th district has always been based in Lima, Ohio and Allen County and now consists of the entire county. It is one-third of the 12th Senate district.  It has a Cook PVI of R+11.

5th district
The 5th district has always consisted of the entirety of Columbiana County. It is one-third of the 33rd Senate district.  It has a Cook PVI of D+2.

6th district
The 6th district has always consisted of portions of Cuyahoga County and now comprises Broadview Heights, Seven Hills, Brecksville, Independence, Valley View, Walton Hills, Oakwood, Glenwillow, Solon, Bentleyville, Chagrin Falls, Moreland Hills, Hunting Valley, Gates Mills, Mayfield, Highland Heights and Lyndhurst. It is one-third of the 24th Senate district.

It has a Cook PVI of R+2.

7th district
The 7th district has always consisted of portions of Cuyahoga County and now comprises Olmsted, Olmsted Falls, Berea, Strongsville, and North Ridgeville. It is one-third of the 24th Senate district.  It has a Cook PVI of R+2.

8th district
The 8th district has always consisted of portions of Cuyahoga County and now comprises Euclid, East Cleveland, Richmond Heights, South Euclid, Beachwood, Woodmere and portions of Cleveland. It is one-third of the 25th Senate district.  It has a Cook PVI of D+26.

Speaker of the House Armond Budish held the seat from 2007 to 2014.

9th district
The 9th district has always consisted of portions of Cuyahoga County and now comprises Cleveland Heights, University Heights, Shaker Heights and portions of Cleveland. It is one-third of the 21st Senate district.

It has a Cook PVI of D+32.

10th district
The 10th district has always consisted of portions of Cuyahoga County and now comprises Bratenahl and portions of Cleveland. It is one-third of the 21st Senate district.  It has a Cook PVI of D+34.

11th district
The 11th district has been based in Cleveland and Cuyahoga County since 1966 and now consists of portions of Cleveland and all of Garfield Heights and Newburgh Heights. It is one-third of the 21st Senate district.  It has a Cook PVI of D+32.

The district was represented from 1967 to 2000 by Troy Lee James, the longest-serving African-American legislator in Ohio history.

12th district
The 12th district has always consisted of portions of Cuyahoga County and now comprises Mayfield Heights, Pepper Pike, Orange, North Randall, Warrensville Heights, Highland Hills, Bedford, Bedford Heights, Maple Heights and portions of Cleveland. It is one-third of the 25th Senate district.  It has a Cook PVI of D+30.

13th district
The 13th district has always consisted of portions of Cuyahoga County and now comprises Lakewood, Linndale and portions of Cleveland. It is one-third of the 23rd Senate district.  It has a Cook PVI of D+20.

Ohio Governor Richard Celeste held the seat from 1971 to 1974.

14th district
The 14th district has been based in Cleveland and Cuyahoga County since 1966, and now consists of portions of Cleveland and all of Brooklyn, Brook Park, Parma Heights and Middleburg Heights. It is one-third of the 23rd Senate district.  It has a Cook PVI of D+10.

15th district
The 15th district has always consisted of portions of Cuyahoga County and now comprises Cuyahoga Heights, Brooklyn Heights, Parma and portions of Cleveland. It is one-third of the 23rd Senate district.  It has a Cook PVI of D+8.

16th district
The 16th district has been based in Cleveland and Cuyahoga County since 1966, and now consists of Bay Village, Rocky River, Westlake, Fairview Park and North Olmsted. It is one-third of the 24th Senate district.  It has a Cook PVI of R+3.

17th district
The 17th district has been based in Columbus, Ohio and Franklin County since 2012, and now consists of Valleyview, Marble Cliff, and portions of Columbus. It is one-third of the 3rd Senate district.  It has a Cook PVI of D+6.

18th district
The 18th district has been based in Columbus, Ohio and Franklin County since 1966, and now consists of Grandview Heights, Bexley, and portions of Columbus and Clinton Township. It is one-third of the 15th Senate district.  It has a Cook PVI of D+20.

19th district
The 19th district has been based in Columbus, Ohio and Franklin County since 1966, and now consists of Westerville, New Albany, Minerva Park, Gahanna and Plain Township and portions of Sharon Township, Blendon Township, Mifflin Township and Columbus. It is one-third of the 3rd Senate district.  It has a Cook PVI of R+6.

The district was represented by the Speaker of the House with Jo Ann Davidson from 1995 to 2000.

20th district
The 20th district has been based in Columbus, Ohio and Franklin County since 1966, and now consists of Whitehall, Reynoldsburg, Groveport, Obetz, Lockbourne and Jefferson Township and portions of Truro Township, Madison Township, Hamilton Township, Pickerington, Canal Winchester, Lithopolis and Columbus.

It is one-third of the 3rd Senate district.  It has a Cook PVI of R+1.

21st district
The 21st district has been based in Columbus, Ohio and Franklin County since 1992 and now consists of Worthington, Dublin, Riverlea, and portions of Columbus, Perry Township, Sharon Township, Washington Township and Norwich Township. It is one-third of the 16th Senate district.  It has a Cook PVI of R+7.

22nd district
The 22nd district has been based in Columbus, Ohio and Franklin County since 1966 and now consists of portions of Columbus. It is one-third of the 19th Senate district.  It has a Cook PVI of D+9.

23rd district
The 23rd district has been based in Columbus, Ohio and Franklin County since 1972 and now consists of Grove City, Jackson Township, Urbancrest, and portions of Columbus, Franklin Township, Hilliard, Prairie Township and Norwich Township. It is one-third of the 16th Senate district.  It has a Cook PVI of R+6.

24th district
The 24th district has been based in Columbus, Ohio and Franklin County since 1966 and now consists of Brown Township, Harrisburg, Pleasant Township, Upper Arlington and portions of Columbus, Franklin Township, Hilliard, Prairie Township, Perry Township, Sharon Township, Washington Township and Norwich Township. It is one-third of the 16th Senate district.  It has a Cook PVI of R+6.

25th district
The 25th district has been based in Columbus, Ohio and Franklin County since 1966 and now consists of portions of Columbus, Clinton Township and Mifflin Township. It is one-third of the 15th Senate district.  It has a Cook PVI of D+28.

Congresswoman Joyce Beatty represented the district from 1999 to 2008.

26th district
The 26th district has been based in Columbus, Ohio and Franklin County since 1966 and now consists of Brice and portions of Columbus, Madison Township and Truro Township. It is one-third of the 15th Senate district.  It has a Cook PVI of D+25.

27th district
The 27th district has been based in Cincinnati, Ohio and Hamilton County since 1966 and now consists Indian Hill, Mariemont, Newtown, Terrace Park, Anderson Township and of portions of Cincinnati, Loveland and Symmes Township. It is one-third of the 7th Senate district.  It has a Cook PVI of R+14.

The district was represented by future Ohio Governor Bob Taft from 1977 to 1980.

28th district
The 28th district has been based in greater Cincinnati, Ohio and Hamilton County since 1966 and now consists of Blue Ash, Deer Park, Evendale, Fairfield, Forest Park, Glendale, Greenhills, Madeira, Montgomery, Reading, Sharonville and Springdale.

It is one-third of the 8th Senate district.  It has a Cook PVI of R+6.

29th district
The 29th district has been based in greater Cincinnati, Ohio and Hamilton County since 1966 and now includes Addyston, Cleves, Harrison and North Bend. It is one-third of the 8th Senate district.  It has a Cook PVI of R+15.

Lou Blessing or his son, Louis Blessing, have represented the district for all but 8 years since 1983.

30th district
The 30th district has been based in greater Cincinnati, Ohio and Hamilton County since 1966 and now includes Cheviot, Delhi, Green Township and portions of Cincinnati. It is one-third of the 8th Senate district.  It has a Cook PVI of R+21.

31st district
The 31st district has been based in Cincinnati, Ohio and Hamilton County since 1966 and now consists Amberley, Silverton, Norwood, St. Bernard, Columbia Township and of portions of Cincinnati and Sycamore Township. It is one-third of the 9th Senate district.  It has a Cook PVI of D+16.

32nd district
The 32nd district has been based in Cincinnati, Ohio and Hamilton County since 1966 and now consists Mount Healthy, North College Hill and of portions of Cincinnati and Springfield Township. It is one-third of the 9th Senate district.  It has a Cook PVI of D+19.

Members of the Mallory family have held the seat for all but eight years since 1966.

33rd district
The 33rd district has been based in Cincinnati, Ohio and Hamilton County since 1966 and now consists of Arlington Heights, Elmwood Place, Golf Manor, Lincoln Heights, Lockland, Woodlawn, Wyoming and portions of Cincinnati, Springfield Township and Sycamore Township.

It is one-third of the 9th Senate district.  It has a Cook PVI of D+18.

34th district
The 34th district has been based in Akron, Ohio since 1966 and now consists of portions of Akron, Bath Township and Cuyahoga Falls. It is one-third of the 28th Senate district.  It has a Cook PVI of D+23.

35th district
The 35th district has been based in Akron, Ohio since 1966 and now consists of portions of Barberton and portions of Akron and Coventry Township. It is one-third of the 28th Senate district.  It has a Cook PVI of D+14.

36th district
The 36th district has been based in Akron, Ohio and Summit County since 1966 and now consists of Lakemore, Mogadore, Tallmadge, Springfield Township, Coventry Township, Green Township and of portions of Cuyahoga Falls. It is one-third of the 28th Senate district.  It has a Cook PVI of D+3.

37th district
The 37th district has been based in Akron, Ohio and Summit County since 1966 and now consists of Hudson, Macedonia, Munroe Falls, Northfield, Reminderville, Silver Lake, Stow, Twinsburg and Twinsburg Township.

It is one-third of the 27th Senate district.  It has a Cook PVI of R+2.

38th district
The 37th district has been based in Akron, Ohio and Summit County since 1966 and now consists of portions of Summit County including Boston Heights, Clinton, Fairlawn, New Franklin, Norton, Peninsula, Richfield, Boston, Copley, Richfield and Sagamore Hills Township and portions of Bath Township and portions of Stark County including Beach City, Brewster, Canal Fulton, Wilmot, Lawrence, Sugar Creek Townships and portions of Massillon and Tuscarawas Township.

It is one-third of the 27th Senate district.  It has a Cook PVI of R+2.

39th district
The 39th district has been based in Dayton, Ohio and Montgomery County since 1966 and now consists Jefferson Township and of portions of Dayton and Trotwood. It is one-third of the 5th Senate district.  It has a Cook PVI of D+29.

40th district
The 40th district has been based in Dayton, Ohio and Montgomery County since 1972 and now consists of Butler Township, Englewood, Huber Heights, Phillipsburg, Union, Vandalia, Verona, Wayne Township and portions of Clayton, Clay Township, Dayton, Harrison Township and Riverside. It is one-third of the 6th Senate district.  It has a Cook PVI of R+7.

41st district
The 41st district has been based in Dayton, Ohio and Montgomery County since 1966 and now consists of Centerville, Kettering, Oakwood and portions of Dayton and Riverside. It is one-third of the 6th Senate district.  It has a Cook PVI of R+8.

42nd district
The 42nd district has been based in Dayton, Ohio and Montgomery County since 1966 and now consists of Carlisle, German Township, Germantown, Miamisburg, Miami Township, Moraine, Springboro, Washington Township and West Carrollton. It is one-third of the 6th Senate district.  It has a Cook PVI of R+12.

43rd district
The 43rd district has been based in Dayton, Ohio and Montgomery County since 1966 and now consists of all of Preble County and Farmersville, New Lebanon, Brookville, Trotwood, Clayton, Harrison Township, Perry Township, Jackson Township, and portions of Dayton. It is one-third of the 5th Senate district.  It has a Cook PVI of D+3.

44th district
The 44th district has been based in Toledo, Ohio and Lucas County since 1966 and now consists of portions of Toledo. It is one-third of the 11th Senate district.  It has a Cook PVI of D+30.

45th district
The 45th district has been based in Toledo, Ohio and Lucas County since 1966 and now consists of Washington Township and portions of Toledo and Sylvania Township. It is one-third of the 11th Senate district.  It has a Cook PVI of D+14.

46th district
The 46th district has been based in Toledo, Ohio and Lucas County since 1966 and now consists of Maumee, Springfield Township, Jerusalem Township, Holland, Oregon and portions of Toledo. It is one-third of the 11th Senate district.  It has a Cook PVI of D+8.

47th district
The 47th district has been based in Toledo, Ohio and Lucas County since 1966 and now consists of portions of Lucas County including Berkey, Ottawa Hills, Swanton, Sylvania, Waterville and Whitehouse and portions of Fulton County including Archbold, Fayette, Metamora, and Wauseon.

It is one-third of the 2nd Senate district.  It has a Cook PVI of R+6.

48th district
The 48th district has been based in Canton, Ohio and Stark County since 1966 and now consists of Hills and Dales, Jackson Township, Meyers Lake, Navarre, North Canton and portions of Bethlehem, Perry, Canton and Plain Townships.

It is one-third of the 29th Senate district.  It has a Cook PVI of R+2.

49th district
The 49th district has been based in Canton, Ohio and Stark County since 1966 and now consists of Canton, East Sparta, Pike Township and portions of Massillon and Canton, Osnaburg, Perry, Plain and Tuscarawas Townships.

It is one-third of the 29th Senate district.  It has a Cook PVI of D+13.

50th district
The 50th district has been based in Canton, Ohio and Stark County since 1966 and now consists of Alliance, East Canton, Hartville, Limaville, Louisville, Magnolia, Minerva, Waynesburg, Lake, Lexington, Marlboro, Nimishillen, Paris, Sandy and Washington Townships and portions of Osnaburg and Plain Townships.

It is one-third of the 29th Senate district.  It has a Cook PVI of R+4.

51st district
The 51st district has been based in Butler County since 1966 and now consists of Fairfield, Hamilton, Ross Township and portions of Fairfield, Hanover and St. Clair Townships. It is one-third of the 4th Senate district.  It has a Cook PVI of R+10.

52nd district
The 52nd district has been based in Butler County since 1966 and now consists of Sharonville, Liberty Township, West Chester Township and portions of Fairfield Township. It is one-third of the 4th Senate district.  It has a Cook PVI of R+19.

The district was represented by United States Speaker of the House John Boehner from 1985 to 1990.

53rd district
The 53rd district has been based in Butler County since 1992 and now consists of College Corner, Jacksonburg, Millville, Monroe, Morgan Township, New Miami, Oxford, Oxford Township, Reilly Township, Seven Mile, Somerville, Trenton, Wayne and portions of Middletown, Hanover and St. Clair Townships. It is one-third of the 4th Senate district.  It has a Cook PVI of R+10.

54th district
The 54th district has always been based in southwestern Ohio, and now comprises portions of Warren County including Lebanon, Mason and Monroe and portions of Butler County including part of Middletown.

It makes up one-third of the 7th Senate district.  It has a Cook PVI of R+13.

55th district
The 55th district has always been based in Elyria, Ohio, and now comprises portions of Lorain County including Avon Lake, Elyria, Grafton, Sheffield and portions of North Ridgeville.

It makes up one-third of the 13th Senate district.  It has a Cook PVI of D+3.

56th district
The 55th district has always been based in Lorain, Ohio, and now comprises portions of Lorain County including Amherst, Kipton, Lorain, Oberlin, Sheffield Lake, South Amherst and Vermilion.

It makes up one-third of the 13th Senate district.  It has a Cook PVI of D+15.

57th district
The 57th district has been based in northern Ohio, and now comprises Huron County and portions of Lorain County including Avon, LaGrange, Rochester, Wellington and portions of North Ridgeville.

It makes up one-third of the 13th Senate district.  It has a Cook PVI of R+4.

58th district
The 58th district has been based in Mahoning County since 1966 and now consists of Campbell, Coitsville Township, Lowellville, Struthers, Youngstown, and portions of Austintown. It is one-third of the 33rd Senate district.  It has a Cook PVI of D+29.

59th district
The 59th district has been based in Mahoning County since 1966 and now includes Beloit, Boardman Township, Canfield, Columbiana, Craig Beach, New Middletown, Poland, Salem, Sebring, Washingtonville and portions of Austintown.

It is one-third of the 33rd Senate district.  It has a Cook PVI of D+7.

60th district
The 60th district has been based in Lake County since 1966 and now includes Eastlake, Fairport Harbor, Grand River, Lakeline, Mentor-on-the-Lake, Painesville, Timberlake, Wickliffe, Willoughby and Willowick.

It is one-third of the 25th Senate district.  It has a Cook PVI of D+4.

61st district
The 61st district has been based in Lake County since 1982 and now includes Kirtland, Kirtland Hills, Madison, North Perry, Perry, Waite Hill and Willoughby Hills.

It is one-third of the 18th Senate district.  It has a Cook PVI of R+5.

62nd district
The 62nd district has been based in suburban Cincinnati since 1966 and now includes portions of Warren County including Blanchester, Butlerville, Carlisle, Corwin, Franklin, Harveysburg, Loveland, Middletown, Morrow, Pleasant Plain, South Lebanon, Springboro and Waynesville.

It is one-third of the 7th Senate district.  It has a Cook PVI of R+13.

63rd district
The 63rd district has been based in Trumbull County since 1966 and now consists of Cortland, Girard, Hubbard, Lordstown, McDonald, Newton Falls, Niles, Orangeville, Yankee Lake and Youngstown.

It is one-third of the 32nd Senate district.  It has a Cook PVI of D+17.

64th district
The 64th district has been based in Trumbull County since 1966 and now consists of portions of Trumbull County including Warren and West Farmington and portions of Ashtabula County including Andover and Orwell.

It is one-third of the 32nd Senate district.  It has a Cook PVI of D+14.

65th district
The 65th district has been based in Clermont County since 1982 and now consists of portions of Clermont County including Loveland, Milford, Newtonsville and Owensville.

It is one-third of the 14th Senate district.  It has a Cook PVI of R+18.

66th district
The 66th district has been based in Brown County since 1992 and now consists of all of Brown County portions of Clermont County including Amelia, Batavia, Bethel, Chilo, Felicity, Moscow, Neville, New Richmond and Williamsburg.

It is one-third of the 14th Senate district.  It has a Cook PVI of R+14.

67th district
The 67th district has always been based in central Ohio, and now comprises portions of Delaware County including Ashley, Delaware, Dublin, Ostrander, Powell and Shawnee Hills.

It makes up one-third of the 19th Senate district.  It has a Cook PVI of R+14.

68th district
The 68th district has always been based in central Ohio, and now comprises Knox County and portions of Delaware County including Columbus, Galena, Sunbury and Westerville.

It makes up one-third of the 19th Senate district.  It has a Cook PVI of R+14.

69th district
The 69th district has always been based in Medina, and now comprises portions of Medina County including Chippewa Lake, Creston, Gloria Glens Park, Lodi, Medina, Wadsworth, Seville and Westfield Center.  It makes up one-third of the 22nd Senate district.  It has a Cook PVI of R+7.

Speaker of the House William G. Batchelder represented the district for much of the last forty years.

70th district
The 70th district is a multi-county district established in 2002 that now consists of all of Ashland County and portions of Holmes County including Holmesville, Loudonville, Millersburg and Nashville and portions of Medina County including Spencer and part of Brunswick.

It is one-third of the 22nd Senate district.  It has a Cook PVI of R+7.

71st district
The 71st district has been based in Licking County since 1966 and now consists of Bennington, Burlington, Eden, Granville, Hartford, Heath, Jersey, Liberty, McKean, Monroe, New Albany, Newark, Newton, Pataskala, Reynoldsburg, St. Louisville, Utica, Washington and portions of Etna Township and Madison.

It is one-third of the 31st Senate district.  It has a Cook PVI of R+8.

72nd district
The 72nd district is a multi-county district in existence since 1966 that now consists of Coshocton and Perry counties and portions of Licking including Alexandria, Bowling Green Township, Buckeye Lake, Fallsbury, Franklin Township, Gratiot, Hanover Township, Harrison Township, Hebron, Hopewell Township, Kirkersville, Licking Township, Mary Ann Township, Perry Township, St. Albans Township, Union Township and portions of Madison Township and Etna Township.

It is one-third of the 31st Senate district.  It has a Cook PVI of R+6. The district was represented by Larry Householder from 1997 to 2004, who served as Speaker of the House from 2001 to 2004.

73rd district
The 73rd district has been based in Greene County since 1966 and now consists Bath Township, Beavercreek, Beavercreek Township, Bellbrook, Centerville, Clifton, Fairborn, Huber Heights, Kettering, Miami Township, Sugarcreek Township and Yellow Springs. It is one-third of the 10th Senate district.  It has a Cook PVI of R+11.

74th district
The 74th district is a multi-county district that has been based in central Ohio since 1966 and now consists of Madison County and portions of Clark County including Catawba and South Vienna and portions of Greene County including Bowersville, Cedarville, Jamestown, Spring Valley and Xenia.

It is one-third of the 10th Senate district.  It has a Cook PVI of R+10.

75th district
The 75th district has been based in Portage County since 1966 and now includes Brady Lake, Kent, Mogadore, Ravenna, Streetsboro, Sugar Bush Knolls and Tallmadge.

It is one-third of the 18th Senate district.  It has a Cook PVI of D+7.

76th district
The 76th district has been based in Geauga County since 1966 and now portions of Geauga County including Burton, Hunting Valley, Middlefield and South Russell and portions of Portage County including Aurora, Garrettsville, Hiram, Mantua, and Windham.

It is one-third of the 18th Senate district.  It has a Cook PVI of R+7.

77th district
The 77th district has been based in Fairfield County since 1966 and now includes Baltimore, Buckeye Lake, Lancaster, and Pickerington.

It is one-third of the 20th Senate district.  It has a Cook PVI of R+9.

78th district
The 78th district has been based in Hocking County since 2012 and now includes all of Hocking County and Morgan County portions of Pickaway County including Ashville, Circleville, Lockbourne, South Bloomfield and Tarlton, portions of Fairfield County including Amanda, Bremen, Carroll, Lithopolis, Stoutsville, Sugar Grove and Tarlton, portions of Athens County including Glouster, Jacksonville and Trimble and portions Muskingum County including Fultonham, Roseville and South Zanesville.

It is one-third of the 20th Senate district.  It has a Cook PVI of R+5.

79th district
The 79th district has been based in Clark County since 1966 and now consists of Bethel Township, Clifton, Donnelsville, Enon, German Township, Green Township, Madison Township, Mad River Township, New Carlisle, North Hampton, Pike Township, South Charleston, Springfield, Springfield Township, Tremont City and portions of Moorefield Township. It is one-third of the 10th Senate district.  It has a Cook PVI of EVEN.

80th district
The 80th district has always been based in western Ohio, and now comprises Miami County and portions of Darke County including Arcanum, Bradford, Castine, Gettysburg, Hollansburg, Ithaca, New Madison, Palestine, Pitsburg and Wayne Lakes.

It makes up one-third of the 5th Senate district.  It has a Cook PVI of R+15.  The district was represented by Bob Netzley, the longest serving member in the history of the Ohio House of Representatives, from 1961 to 2000.

81st district
The 81st district has always been based in northwest Ohio, and now comprises Williams, Henry and Putnam counties, and portions of Fulton County including Delta and Swanton.

It makes up one-third of the 1st Senate district.  It has a Cook PVI of R+11.

82nd district
The 82nd district has always been based in northwest Ohio, and now comprises Defiance, Paulding and Van Wert counties, and portions of Auglaize County including Buckland, St. Marys and Wapakoneta.

It makes up one-third of the 1st Senate district.  It has a Cook PVI of R+10.

83rd district
The 83rd district is a multi-county district established in 1982 that now comprises Hancock and Hardin counties and portions of Logan County including Belle Center, Ridgeway, Rushsylvania and West Mansfield.

It makes up one-third of the 1st Senate district.  It has a Cook PVI of R+13.

84th district
The 84th district is a multi-county district established in 1982 that now comprises Mercer county and portions of Auglaize County including Cridersville, Minster, New Bremen, New Knoxville, Uniopolis and Waynesfield, portions of Darke County including Ansonia, Burkettsville, Greenville, New Weston, North Star, Osgood, Rossburg, Union City, Versailles and Yorkshire and portions of Shelby County including Anna, Botkins, Fort Loramie, Jackson Center, Kettlersville and Russia.

It makes up one-third of the 12th Senate district.  It has a Cook PVI of R+19, making it the most Republican district in the state.

85th district
The 85th district is a multi-county district established in 1966 that now comprises Champaign County and portions of Logan County including Bellefontaine, De Graff, Huntsville, Lakeview, Quincy, Russells Point, Valley Hi and Zanesfield and portions of Shelby County including Lockington, Port Jefferson and Sidney.

It makes up one-third of the 12th Senate district.  It has a Cook PVI of R+12.  From 2001 to 2006, the district was represented by Derrick Seaver, who at 18 was the youngest member ever elected to the Ohio House of Representatives.

86th district
The 86th district has always been based in west-central Ohio, and now comprises Union County and the majority of Marion County including Big Island, Green Camp, LaRue, Marion, New Bloomington, Prospect and Waldo.

It makes up one-third of the 26th Senate district.  It has a Cook PVI of R+11.

87th district
The 87th district has always been based in west-central Ohio, and now comprises Crawford County, Morrow County and Wyandot County and the portions of Marion County including Caledonia and Morral and portions of Seneca County including New Riegel.

It makes up one-third of the 26th Senate district.  It has a Cook PVI of R+10.

88th district
The 88th district has always been based in north-central Ohio, and now comprises Sandusky County and the portions of Seneca County including Attica, Bettsville, Bloomville, Fostoria, Green Springs, Republic and Tiffin.

It makes up one-third of the 26th Senate district.  It has a Cook PVI of R+2.

89th district
The 89th district has always been based in Sandusky in 1966 that now comprises Ottawa and Erie counties.  It makes up one-third of the 2nd Senate district.  It has a Cook PVI of D+4.

90th district
The 90th district has always been based in southern Ohio, and now comprises Adams County, Scioto County and portions of Lawrence County including Coal Grove, Hanging Rock and Ironton. It makes up one-third of the 14th Senate district.  It has a Cook PVI of D+1.

The district has been known as 'Vern Riffe Country', as it was represented by Vern Riffe, the longest serving Speaker of the House in Ohio history.

91st district
The 91st district has always been based in southern Ohio, and now comprises Clinton, Highland and Pike counties, and two townships in Ross County.  It makes up one-third of the 17th Senate district.  It has a Cook PVI of R+8.

It is the seat of the current Speaker of the Ohio House of Representatives, Cliff Rosenberger.

92nd district
The 92nd district has always been based in southern Ohio, and now comprises Fayette County and all but two townships in Ross County and portions of Pickaway County including Commercial Point, Darbyville, Harrisburg, New Holland, Orient and Williamsport.

It makes up one-third of the 17th Senate district.  It has a Cook PVI of R+5.  The seat was represented by former Ohio Lieutenant Governor Myrl Shoemaker from 1959 to 1982.

93rd district
The 93rd district has always been based in southern Ohio, and now comprises Gallia County, Jackson County, portions of Lawrence County including Athalia, Chesapeake, Proctorville and South Point; and portions of Vinton County including McArthur.

It makes up one-third of the 17th Senate district.  It has a Cook PVI of R+4.

94th district
The 94th district has been based in southern Ohio since 2002, and now comprises Meigs County and portions of Athens County including Albany, Amesville, Athens, Buchtel, Chauncey, Coolville and Nelsonville, portions of Vinton County including Hamden, Wilkesville and Zaleski and portions of Washington County including Belpre and parts of Marietta.

It makes up one-third of the 30th Senate district.  It has a Cook PVI of D+8.

95th district
The 95th district sprawls across southeastern Ohio and now comprises Carroll, Harrison and Noble counties and portions of Belmont County including Barnesville, Belmont, Bethesda, Fairview, Flushing, Holloway, Morristown, St. Clairsville and Wilson and Washington County including Beverly, Lowell, Lower Salem, Macksburg, Matamoras and part of Marietta.

It makes up one-third of the 30th Senate district.  It has a Cook PVI of EVEN.  The seat is unique as Ohio Governor Nancy P. Hollister represented the district following her governorship, albeit she was only Governor for 10 days.

96th district
The 96th district has been based in Steubenville since 1966 and now comprises all of Jefferson and Monroe counties and portions of Belmont County including Bellaire, Bridgeport, Brookside, Colerain, Martins Ferry, Mead Township, Pease Township, Powhatan Point, Pultney Township, Shadyside, Smith Township, Washington Township, York Township and Yorkville.

It makes up one-third of the 30th Senate district.  It has a Cook PVI of D+10.

97th district
The 97th district has been based in Zanesville, Ohio and Muskingum County since 1966 and now consists of all of Guernsey County and the majority of Muskingum County.  It has a Cook PVI of R+3.

98th district
The 98th district has been based in eastern Ohio since 1966 and now comprises Tuscarawas County,  and portions of Holmes County including Baltic, Glenmont and Killbuck. It makes up one-third of the 31st Senate district.  It has a Cook PVI of R+4.

The district was represented by Speaker of the House A.G. Lancione for over thirty years, who was followed by former Congressman Wayne Hays and future Congressmen Bob Ney and Charlie Wilson.

99th district
The 99th district has been based in Ashtabula, Ohio since 1966 and now comprises most of Ashtabula County including Ashtabula, Conneaut, Geneva, Geneva-on-the-Lake, Jefferson, North Kingsville, Roaming Shores and Rock Creek, and portions of Geauga County including Aquilla and Chardon.

It makes up one-third of the 32nd Senate district.  It has a Cook PVI of D+4.

Defunct districts

Former Cuyahoga County and Lucas County districts
Cuyahoga County has had six districts eliminated since 1966, the first eliminated following the 1972 redistricting, and most recently in 2012.  Lucas County, Ohio, has lost one district since 1966, eliminated following the 1972 redistricting.

10th district (1966-1982)
The 10th district was active from 1966 to 1982.

48th district (1966-1972)
The 48th district was active from 1966 to 1972.  

51st district (1966-1972)
The 51st district was active from 1966 to 1972.

57th district (1966-1972)
The 57th district was active from 1966 to 1972.

55th district (1966-1972)
The 55th district was active from 1966 to 1972.

53rd district (1966-1972)
The 53rd district was active from 1966 to 1972.

77th district (1966-1972)
The 77th district was active from 1966 to 1972.

Former multi-county districts
The 2nd district from 1966 to 1972 comprised Paulding, Van Wert and Auglaize counties and portions of Putnam and Mercer counties.  It was combined with another district following the 1970 census.

See also
 List of Ohio state legislatures

References

Ohio House of Representatives